James Tolmie may refer to:
 James Tolmie (Canadian politician) (1855–1917), politician in British Columbia, Canada
 James Tolmie (Australian politician) (1862–1939), Australian newspaper owner and politician
 J. C. Tolmie (James Craig Tolmie, 1862–1938), Canadian politician, Presbyterian clergyman and military chaplain